Alexander L. Duncan (1891 – after 1912) was a Scottish professional footballer who played as a winger.

References

1891 births
Footballers from Glasgow
Scottish footballers
Association football wingers
Cambuslang F.C. players
Portsmouth F.C. players
Grimsby Town F.C. players
English Football League players
Year of death missing